"Empire" is a song by the heavy metal band Queensrÿche, appearing on their 1990 album Empire. 
The lyrical content of the song warns of a foreboding and unstoppable "Empire" of drug trafficking within the United States and its related crimes, that will inevitably lead to the breakdown of civility in American society.

Known as a fan favorite, the group has played the song often live, doing so over a thousand times as of April 2016, and the track is the band's second most played song in its setlist history. It is exceeded only by "Eyes of a Stranger".

Track listing
7" single

12" single

CD single

Chart performance

Personnel
Geoff Tate – vocals
Michael Wilton – lead guitar
Chris DeGarmo – rhythm guitar
Eddie Jackson – bass
Scott Rockenfield – drums

Additional personnel
Randy Gane – message left on answering machine

References

1990 singles
1990 songs
EMI Records singles
Queensrÿche songs
Song recordings produced by Peter Collins (record producer)
Songs about drugs
Songs written by Geoff Tate
Songs written by Michael Wilton